Estill may refer to:

Places
Estill, Kentucky
Estill, Missouri
Estill, South Carolina
Federal Correctional Institution, Estill
Estill County, Kentucky

Other uses
Estill (surname)